Archibald D. Marston CBE (1891–1962) was a British medical man. He was the first dean of the Royal College of Anaesthetists, serving from 1948 to 1952.

Marston's medical career began in 1909, as a dental student at Guy's Hospital. He became a consultant anaesthetist at Guy's in 1919.

References

Deans of the Royal College of Anaesthetists
British anaesthetists
1891 births
1962 deaths
Commanders of the Order of the British Empire
Presidents of the Association of Anaesthetists